Price Pritchett is a business advisor, speaker, and author specializing in mergers, culture, and organizational change.

Biography 

Pritchett was born December 14, 1941, near Glenwood, Arkansas.

In 1974, Pritchett founded the  Pritchett & Associates (now Pritchett LP) in Dallas, Texas. It was reportedly the first firm in the United States to specialize in merger integration strategy.  Pritchett has written books on corporate mergers, large scale change, leadership, culture as well as personal and organizational performance.

Books 

Mergers & Acquisitions
After the Merger: Managing the Shockwaves
Making Mergers Work: A Guide to Managing Mergers and Acquisitions
The Employee Guide to Mergers and Acquisitions
Smart Moves: A Crash Course on Merger Integration Management
Mergers: Growth in the Fast Lane

Change Management
Deep Strengths: Getting to the Heart of High Performance (Release Date: October, 2007)
Business As UnUsual: The Handbook for Managing and Supervising Organizational Change
The Employee Handbook for Organizational Change
The 4th Level of Change
Firing Up Commitment During Organizational Change
Resistance: Moving Beyond the Barriers to Change
A Survival Guide to the Stress of Organizational Change
Team ReConstruction: Building a High Performance Work Group During Change
Teamwork: The Team Member Handbook
MindShift: The Employee Handbook for Understanding the Changing World of Work
Outsourced: 12 New Rules for Running Your Career in an Interconnected World
The Unfolding: A Handbook for Living Strong, Being Effective, and Knowing Happiness During Uncertain Times
The Employee Handbook of New Work Habits for a Radically Changing World
The Employee Handbook of New Work Habits for the Next Millennium

Culture
High-Velocity Culture Change: A Handbook for Managers
The Employee Handbook for Shaping Corporate Culture:  The Mission Critical Approach to Culture Integration and Culture Change 
Culture Shift: The Employee Handbook for Changing Corporate Culture
        
Individual Performance
Fast Growth: A Career Acceleration StrategyThe Ethics of ExcellenceHard Optimism: Developing Deep Strengths for Managing Uncertainty, Opportunity, Adversity, and ChangeThe Mars Pathfinder Approach to “Faster-Better-Cheaper”: An Employee Handbook on InnovationYou 2 (squared): A High-Velocity Formula for Multiplying Your Personal Effectiveness in Quantum LeapsThe Quantum Leap StrategyService Excellence!Solution #1The ComebackWhat's Next?    
LeadershipCarpe Mañana: 10 Critical Leadership Practices for Managing Toward the FutureManaging Sideways: Using the Rummler-Brache Process Improvement Approach to Achieve Performance Breakthrough''

External links 
PRITCHETT, LP Change Management website
PRITCHETT's Merger Integration website

1941 births
Living people
People from Pike County, Arkansas
Business speakers